Hypena obesalis, the Paignton snout, is a moth of the family Noctuoidea. It is found in Europe from the Iberian Peninsula through Central Europe in mountainous regions. To the east, the distribution area extends through the Palearctic to China. In the Alps it rises to altitudes of 2000 meters.

Technical description and variation

B. obesalis Tr.  Ground colour  light ochreous, not white or grey; the inner line becomes obscure below median; the outer is vertically outcurved from subcostal to median vein with two smaller curves below. Larva grass green with yellow segmental incisions; dorsum grey; lateral lines slender, white; spiracles orange. The wingspan is ca. 40 mm.

Biology
The moth flies from June onwards.

The larvae feed gregariously on nettle spinning up for pupation in a leaf.

References

External links

Paignton Snout at UKmoths
Fauna Europaea
Lepiforum.de
Vlindernet.nl 

obesalis
Moths of Europe
Moths of Asia
Taxa named by Georg Friedrich Treitschke
Moths described in 1828